Rich Harvest Farms is a private golf course and country club near Sugar Grove, Illinois, about  west of downtown Chicago. Built in 1989 and expanded in 1999, the 18-hole championship golf course is on an expansive .

Owner 
Jerome "Jerry" Rich, the estate's owner and president, is a self-made businessman and alumnus of Northern Illinois University. Rich's father, Anthony "AJ" Rich started his own company – Rich Inc – where Jerry went to work after graduation.  Not long after he started working for his father's company, he invented a method to incorporate many separate stock exchange software programs into one, putting Rich Inc. on the map.

Course accolades 
In 1999, Rich Harvest Links was named the fifth-best new private course in the U.S. by Golf Digest. The course made its debut on Golf Digest's list of "America's Top 100 Golf Courses" in 2003. The famous fourth hole, Devil's Elbow, has one of the most intimidating tree-lined tee boxes and fairways of any golf course. Rich Harvest Farms is also the home course of the Northern Illinois University Huskies men's and women's golf teams of Northern Illinois University in nearby DeKalb. In addition to a golf course and several private residences, the  rural site houses several antique stage coaches and a collection of vintage and modern vehicles.

Public events 
Rich Harvest Farms hosted the Solheim Cup in 2009. The course was used for the Ryder Cup Captain's Challenge in 2012. The primary competition was held at Medinah Country Club in Medinah, Illinois.

Rich Harvest Farms hosted the fifth event in 2022 of the LIV Golf Invitational Series.

Past events
2003 Mid-American Conference Championship
2007 NCAA Regional
2009 Solheim Cup
2011-2018 Northern Intercollegiate
2012 Mid-American Conference Championship
2013 Chip Beck #59 Charity Pro-Am
2014 NCAA Regional
2015 Palmer Cup
2015 Western Amateur
2017 NCAA Men's & Women's Championships
2019 Western Junior Championship
2020 Big Ten Men's Golf Championships
2021 Arnold Palmer Cup
2022 LIV Golf Invitational Chicago

Gallery

References

External links 

Golf clubs and courses in Illinois
Solheim Cup venues
Big Rock, Illinois
Sugar Grove, Illinois
Buildings and structures in Kane County, Illinois
1989 establishments in Illinois